Straton or Strato may refer to:
 Strato I, Indo-Greek king
 Strato II, Indo-Greek king
 Strato of Lampsacus (c. 335 – c. 269 BC), Greek philosopher
 Straton of Sardis, Greek poet and anthologist
 Abdashtart I (Straton I, 365–352 BC), king of Sidon
 Straton of Alexandria, ancient Greek wrestler and pancratiast (fl. c. 68/64 BC)
 Straton of Alexandria, ancient Greek runner (fl. c. 77 AD)
 Straton, character in The Sacred Band of Stepsons novels
 Strato AG, a German hosting provider

People with the surname
 John Roach Straton (1875–1929), pastor
 Taya Straton (1960–1996), Australian actress

See also
 B-52 Stratofortress, a strategic bomber made by Boeing
 C-135 Stratolifter, a multi-purpose aircraft made by Boeing
 KC-135 Stratotanker, a mid-air refueling aircraft made by Boeing
 Straton's Tower or Caesarea Maritima, a place in Israel
 Stratton (disambiguation)

Greek-language surnames